The Ministry of Territorial Policy (MPT), is the department of the Government of Spain which manages the policies of the government regarding relations and cooperation with the Autonomous Communities and with the entities that integrate the Local Administration and those related to the territorial organization of the country and with the Government Delegations and Sub-Delegations in the regions and provinces.

The MPTFP is also in charge of the proposal and carrying out the government policy in matters of civil service, public employment and training of public employees; of governance and organization of the General State Administration; of procedures and inspection of services; of transparency and open government; of the development and monitoring of programs to improve public management and the quality of services.

Likewise, it is responsible for the Digital Administration policy, as well as the coordination of the process of rationalization of information and communication technologies in the field of the General State Administration and its public agencies, and the promotion of e-Government. through the shared provision of the Common Service of Information and Communication Systems; It is also responsible for establishing the necessary provisions and guidelines for its operation.

History 
This Ministry was created for the first time in 1979 after the approval of the Constitution of 1978 in order to adapt the centralized administration to the new decentralized territorial administration. At the beginning, it assumed the relations with the already formed regions, the regions in process of formation and the local administration.

Previously, between 1977 and 1979 there was the figure of the Assistant Ministry of the Regions which, led by Manuel Clavero, developed the pre-autonomy agreements of the various regions and nationalities of Spain.

Initially it was endowed with a small structure, composed of a Undersecretariat, a Technical General Secretariat and two Directorates-General: Cooperation with Autonomous Regimes and Local Cooperation, this last transferred from the Ministry of the Interior.

In the words of Prime Minister Adolfo Suárez before the Congress of Deputies in 18 April 1979:

One year later, and with the aim of strengthening the administrative structures that facilitated the process of devolution to the Autonomous Communities, the Secretary of State for the Autonomous Communities, the Secretary of State for Local Corporations and the Directorate-General for Autonomic Development were created.

After the arrival of the Socialist Workers' Party to the Government, in 1983 the Ministry was again the object of remodeling. The Secretary of State for Local Corporations disappeared and four Directorates-General were established: Autonomic Development; Cooperation with the Autonomous Communities; Local Management; and Local Cooperation.

The great reshuffle takes place, nevertheless, in 1986, when the Department is renamed «for the Public Administrations» and receives powers on Civil Service and Administrative Modernization that until that moment exerted the Ministry of the Presidency.

A new extension of powers took place in 1997, as a consequence of the approval of the Law 6/1997, of April 14, of Organization and Functioning of the General State Administration, which organically assigns to it the Government Delegations (until then dependents from Interior).

These three areas of activity (Relationship with Autonomous and Local Administrations, Civil Service, and coordination of the Government Delegations) have remained as the competence axis of the Department, except for the period 2009-2010, in which the last two passed temporarily to the Ministry of the Presidency. These three areas of work (Relations with Autonomous and Local Administrations, Civil Service, and coordination of the Government Delegations) have remained as the responsibilities axis of the Department, except for the period 2009-2010, in which the last two passed temporarily to the Ministry of the Presidency.

Since December 22, 2011, the powers of this Department were integrated into the Ministry of the Treasury, which was renamed the Ministry of the Treasury and Public Administration. All its functions were assigned to the Secretary of State for Public Administrations. In 2016, the functions of relations with the regions and local administrations were transferred to the Presidency Ministry and it wasn't until 2018 that this Ministry was recovered assuming all of its historic responsibilities.

Organization chart 

The current structure of the Ministry is:

 Secretariat of State for Territorial Policy
General Secretariat for Territorial Coordination
 Directorate-General for Regional and Local Cooperation
 Directorate-General for Regional and Local Legal Regime
Directorate-General for the General State Administration in the Territory
 Undersecretariat of Territorial Policy
 Technical General Secretariat

List of Ministers
 I Legislature (1979–1982) – It is called Ministry of Territorial Administration
 (1979–1980): Antonio Fontán Pérez (UCD)
 (1980): José Pedro Pérez Llorca Rodrigo (UCD)
 (1980–1981): Rodolfo Martín Villa (UCD)
 (1981–1982): Rafael Arias Salgado (UCD)
 (1982): Luis Manuel Coscuella Montaner (UCD)

 II Legislature (1982–1986) - It is called Ministry of Territorial Administration
 (1982–1985): Tomás de la Quadra-Salcedo (PSOE)
 (1985–1986): Félix Pons Irazazábal (PSOE)
 (1986): Javier Moscoso del Prado y Muñoz (PSOE) - Interino
 III Legislature (1986–1989) - It is called Ministry for Public Administrations
 (1986–1989): Joaquín Almunia Amann (PSOE)
 IV Legislature (1989–1993) - It is called Ministry for Public Administrations
 (1989–1991): Joaquín Almunia Amann (PSOE)
 (1991–1993): Juan Manuel Eguiagaray Ucelay (PSOE)
 V Legislature (1993–1996)- It is called Ministry for Public Administrations
 (1993–1995): Jerónimo Saavedra Acevedo (PSOE)
 (1995–1996): Joan Lerma i Blasco (PSOE)
 VI Legislature (1996–2000) - It is called Ministry for Public Administrations
 (1996–1999): Mariano Rajoy Brey (PP)
 (1999–2000): Ángel Acebes Paniagua (PP)
 VII Legislature (2000–2004) - It is called Ministry for Public Administrations
 (2000–2002): Jesús María Posada Moreno (PP)
 (2002–2003): Javier Arenas Bocanegra (PP)
 (2003–2004): Julia García-Valdecasas (PP)
 VIII Legislature (2004–2008)- It is called Ministry for Public Administrations
 (2004–2007): Jordi Sevilla Segura (PSOE)
 (2007–2008): Elena Salgado (PSOE)
 IX Legislature (2008–2011)- It is called Ministry for Public Administrations and then Ministry of Territorial Policy and Public Administrations
 (2008–2009): Elena Salgado (PSOE)
 (2009–2011): Manuel Chaves (PSOE)
 X Legislature (2011–2016)- It is called Ministry of Finance and Public Administrations
 (2011–2016): Cristóbal Montoro Romero (PP)
 XI Legislature and XII Legislature (2016–2020)
 (2016–2018): Soraya Sáenz de Santamaría (PP), Minister for Territorial Administrations
 (2018–2019): Meritxell Batet (PSOE), Minister of Territorial Policy and Civil Service
 XIII and XIV Legislature (2019–present)
 (2019–2020): Luis Planas (PSOE), Minister of Territorial Policy and Civil Service
 (2020–2021): Carolina Darias (PSOE), Minister of Territorial Policy and Civil Service
(2021): Miquel Iceta (PSOE), Minister of Territorial Policy and Civil Service
(2021–): Isabel Rodríguez (PSOE), Minister of Territorial Policy.

References 

Spanish Cabinets at CSIC website

External links
 "Ministerio de Política Territorial" official page

Territorial Policy
Territorial

es:Ministerio de Hacienda y Administraciones Públicas de España